() is a trans-Neptunian object and a detached object from the outermost region of the Solar System. With a perihelion of 50.2 AU, it belongs to the top 10 minor planets with the highest known perihelia of the Solar System. and is neither a scattered disc nor an extreme trans-Neptunian object.

Orbit and classification 

 orbits the Sun at a distance of 50.2–158.9 AU once every 1069 years; semi-major axis of 104.53 AU. Its orbit has an eccentricity of 0.52 and an inclination of 43.16° with respect to the ecliptic.

 is a distant minor planet and trans-Neptunian object (TNO) beyond the orbit of Neptune and the Kuiper cliff. , it has the 8th highest perihelia of all known minor planets. Based on a still sufficiently determined perihelion a of 50.2 AU, it is not a member of the scattered disc population, as these objects are thought to have been ejected from the classical Kuiper belt into their current orbits by gravitational interactions with Neptune (semi-major axis of 30.1 AU), and typically have highly eccentric orbits and perihelia of less than 38 AU. 's orbit, however, has never brought it close enough to Neptune to be gravitational disturbed.

On the other hand, this TNO is not an extreme trans-Neptunian object as these objects generally have higher perihelia and/or higher eccentricities. Instead, it is located in a virtually unpopulated region at a perihelion of 50 AU and an eccentricity of 0.5 (see adjunct images, where the grid crosses at q50 AU and e0.5) 

The Kozai mechanism is capable of transferring orbital eccentricity to a higher inclination.

Physical characteristics

Diameter and albedo 

The body's color, rotation period, pole and shape remain unknown.

Notes

References

External links 
 Trans-Neptunian objects found in the first four years of the Dark Energy Survey, 11 Feb 2020
 2014 ST373: a detached object not in resonance with Neptune announced today, Groups.io, 4 Feb 2020

Possible dwarf planets
20140925